Matti Kuosku (4 March 1941 – 22 April 2012) was a Swedish cross-country skier. He competed in the 50 km event at the 1976 Winter Olympics. Kuosku was a Sweden Finn, and he had moved to Sweden in the late 1960s. In 1974 and 1976, he won Vasaloppet.

Cross-country skiing results

Olympic Games

References

External links
 

1941 births
2012 deaths
Cross-country skiers at the 1976 Winter Olympics
Swedish male cross-country skiers
Olympic cross-country skiers of Sweden
People from Pelkosenniemi
Finnish emigrants to Sweden
Naturalized citizens of Sweden
Swedish people of Finnish descent